Samuel Edward Branch, OBE (25 March 1861, in Barbados – 9 July 1932, in Antigua) was an Anglican priest: most notably  Archdeacon of Antigua from 1906 until 1921.

He was born in Barbados, the son of Charles Branch and  Susan, daughter of Eyre Hutson. He was educated at The Lodge School and Codrington College. He was ordained in 1886 by his father.  Branch was Headmaster of Antigua Grammar School from 1884 to 1927. 

1861 births
19th-century Anglican priests
20th-century Anglican priests
Anglican bishops of Antigua
1932 deaths
Archdeacons of Antigua
Alumni of Codrington College
Barbadian religious leaders
Officers of the Order of the British Empire